Fausat Adebola Ibikunle is the commissioner of Ministry of Housing and Urban Developments and was the general manager of the Kaduna State Urban Planning & Development Authority (KASUPDA). She is appointed by the Governor of Kaduna State Mallam Nasir Ahmad el-Rufai.

Early life and education
Fausat was born in Doka district of Kaduna State. She graduated from Ahmadu Bello University with a bachelor's degree in architecture in 1983.

Career
In 1984, she worked with Ministry of Defence, and later the Federal Capital Development Authority were in 2005 she become assistant director in the Public Buildings Department. In 2007, Fausat become deputy director in the Health and Human Services Secretariat in the Federal Capital Territory. Later on she become commissioner of Housing and Urban Development. She is currently the General manager of the Urban Planning and Development Authority (KASUPDA) of the Kaduna State.

See also
Ministries of Kaduna State

References

External links

Living people
People from Kaduna State
Ahmadu Bello University alumni
Yoruba women
Year of birth missing (living people)